Jiajing (28 January 1522 – 8 February 1567) was the era name of the Jiajing Emperor, the 12th emperor of the Ming dynasty of China. The Ming dynasty used the era name Jiajing for a total of 45 years. It was the second-longest used era name in the Ming dynasty. "Jiajing" was derived from the words 嘉靖殷邦 (Translated: "... but admirably and tranquilly presided over the regions of Yin, ...) in the chapter of Wuyi (無逸, Against Luxurious Ease) in the Book of Documents. When the Jiajing Emperor ascended the throne, the cabinet's candidate era names were the first "Mingliang" (明良; meaning 君明臣良 "the monarch is bright and ministers are good"), followed by "Shaozhi" (紹治; meaning "inheriting the Hongzhi Restoration"), and the third "Jiajing".

On 4 February 1567 (Jiajing 45, 14th day of the 12th month), the Longqing Emperor ascended to the throne and continued to use. The era was changed to Longqing in the following year.

Comparison table

Other regime era names that existed during the same period
 China
 Tianyuan (天淵, 1546): Ming period — era name of Tian Bin (田斌), leader of the Wenshang uprising in Shandong
 Zaoli (造歷) or Longfei (龍飛) (1560–1562): Ming period — era name of Zhang Lian (張璉), leader of the peasant revolt in Guangdong
 Dabao (大寶, 1565): Ming period — era name of Cai Boguan (蔡伯貫), leader of the peasant revolt in Sichuan
 Vietnam
 Quang Thiệu (光紹, 1516–1522): Later Lê dynasty — era name of Lê Chiêu Tông
 Thống Nguyên (統元, 1522–1526): Later Lê dynasty — era name of Lê Cung Hoàng
 Nguyên Hòa (元和, 1533–1548): Later Lê dynasty — era name of Lê Trang Tông
 Quang Chiếu (光照, 1533–1536): Later Lê dynasty — era name of Lê Hiến, Prince Đại (代王 黎憲)
 Thuận Bình (順平, 1548–1556): Later Lê dynasty — era name of Lê Trung Tông
 Thiên Hựu (天祐, 1557): Later Lê dynasty — era name of Lê Anh Tông
 Chính Trị (天祐, 1558–1571): Later Lê dynasty — era name of Lê Anh Tông
 Minh Đức (明德, 1527–1529): Mạc dynasty — era name of Mạc Đăng Dung
 Đại Chính (大正, 1530–1540): Mạc dynasty — era name of Mạc Thái Tông
 Quảng Hòa (廣和, 1541–1546): Mạc dynasty — era name of Mạc Hiến Tông
 Vĩnh Định (永定, 1547): Mạc dynasty — era name of Mạc Tuyên Tông
 Cảnh Lịch (景歷, 1548–1555): Mạc dynasty — era name of Mạc Tuyên Tông
 Quang Bảo (光寶, 1555–1564): Mạc dynasty — era name of Mạc Tuyên Tông
 Thuần Phúc (淳福, 1565–1568): Mạc dynasty — era name of Mạc Mậu Hợp
 Sùng Khang (淳福, 1568–1578): Mạc dynasty — era name of Mạc Mậu Hợp
 Japan
 Daiei (大永, 1521–1528): era name of Emperor Go-Kashiwabara and Emperor Go-Nara
 Kyōroku (享禄, 1528–1532): era name of Emperor Go-Nara
 Tenbun (天文, 1532–1555): era name of Emperor Go-Nara
 Kōji (弘治, 1555–1558): era name of Emperor Go-Nara and Emperor Ōgimachi
 Eiroku (永禄, 1558–1570): era name of Emperor Ōgimachi

See also
 List of Chinese era names
 List of Ming dynasty era names

References

Further reading

Ming dynasty eras